Joseph Pisani (born November 17, 1976) is an American contemporary artist, abstract painter, and photographer, living in Zurich, Switzerland.

Life
Joseph Pisani was born and raised in the Bronx, New York, by a second-generation Italian family with strong ethnic roots. He was originally taught to draw and paint by his grandmother at around the age of seven.

He left New York in 1994 and traveled throughout America, including visits to forty-two of the fifty states, before setting off on a "backpack" solo tour of Western Europe. He stayed in Prague for a time, and in 1996 settled in the Rocky mountains, West of Denver, Colorado. As well as painting and drawing, he began to design and produce furniture and to experiment with wood sculpture and mixed media.

In 1998 he traveled again in Europe and the Middle East and found "an interesting spot hidden between two worlds" in the South Sinai, Egypt, where he discovered scuba diving. The influence of the colorful underwater life of the Red Sea is apparent in paintings, such as "The Secrets of the Underwater World", and "Deep (Approximately 63 Meters Below the Red Sea)".

Pisani continues to travel extensively, visiting seventy-one countries to date  and uses his travel, along with philosophy, as the main source of inspiration for his art.

Art
Pisani's is influenced by the Abstract Expressionism of Mark Rothko and Barnett Newman. However, unlike Rothko, who purposely avoided giving titles to his work, because he did not want to influence viewers, Pisani deliberately lends clues through the poetic titles of his paintings:

Recent exhibitions
(* denotes solo exhibition)
 2017 November 7. - 18., Kulturpark, Zurich, Switzerland, "art braille kanthari", charity auction and exhibition with Stefan Puttaert, Director of Sotheby's Zurich, and Christine Meier.*
 2017 January - 18. March, Galerie Le Sud, Zurich, Switzerland "The Smoke that Thunders", Under the patronage of the permanent mission of Zambia to the United Nations (UNO), Geneva.*
 2014 January, Kunstgalerie Bachlechner, Bergdietikon, Switzerland "How to do Everything in Just One Lifetime", Under the Patronage of the US Consulate in Zurich*
 2013 October, Galleria Fogga, Helsinki, Finland, "Oneironauts (Explorers of the Dream World)"*
 2011 Kunstgalerie Bachlechner, Bergdietikon, Switzerland, "Chaos Within - 40 Years Pisani", Under the Patronage of the US Consulate in Zurich*
 2011 Gallery Ferin, Helsinki, Finland, "When The Morning Star Begins to Fade"
 2009-28 November 2010, 2009 - January 16, 2010, Gallery Eule-Art, Davos, Switzerland "Fire & Ice"
 15 April 2009, Artseefeld, Zurich, Switzerland "AGENT 488"*
 4 February 2008, United Nations Office Geneva, "Oh Sweet Serendipity" Special Showing in Association with Sri Lanka's 60th Independence Anniversary* Info. and photos from exhibition
 19 January 2008 - February 23, 2008, Kunstgalerie Bachlechner, Weiningen, Switzerland, “Oh Sweet Serendipity” Under the Patronage of the Permanent Mission of Sri Lanka to the United Nations office in Geneva*
 29 September 2007 - December 23, 2007, Kunstgalerie Bachlechner, Ost Tirol, Austria, “Kunst Verbindet” — together with Le Corbusier, Hans Peter Profunser, Marianne Liegl...
 27 January 2007 - February 25, 2007, Kunstgalerie Bachlechner, Weiningen, Switzerland, “Magic Cube” — together with Jan Janczak, Paul Cartier, Paul Racle...
 26 October 2006–Present (Permanent Exhibit), Consulate of the USA in Zurich, Switzerland, “All the Colors of My Memories from Home”*
 18 November 2006 - December 23, Kunstgalerie Bachlechner, Weiningen, Switzerland, ”Train Station” — together with Charles Sambono (Zambia), Gerry Mayer (Austria)
 2006 September - November, Zurich, Switzerland, *“That Lasting Tingle of Déjà Vu”*, Under the patronage of the consulate of the USA in Zurich

See also
Abstract Expressionism

Footnotes

 Mordasini, Marco, Ausdrucksstark mit Liebe zum Detail "Chaos Within" Eröffnung, Limmattaler Zeitung, August 30, 2011, Page 16 Article as PDF
 "Every Great Journey Begins with a Dream" Joseph Pisani Lecture sponsored by the US Embassy in Finland and conducted at the American Resource Center at the National Library of Finland, Helsinki, March 31, 2011 Link to US Embassy in Finland web site news
 Joseph Pisani: Guest on Swiss Television Talk Show "Aeschbacher", April 4, 2008 Swiss Television Video Portal
 Natalie Isenring "Ein Nomade mit satändigem Sitz in Zürich", Tages Anzeiger, January 24, 2008, Page 58 (Article as PDF)
 Santosh Brivio "Eine künstlerische Reiseerzählung", Limmattal Zeitung, January 21, 2008, Page 11 (Article as PDF )
 Kristina Pranter-Kreuzer "Kunstwelt zu Gast in Außervillgraten", Kleine Zeitung, October 2, 2007 (Article as PDF)
 Paulina Szczesniak, "Glanzlichter der Woche (Highlights of the Week)", Zueritipp, No. 43, October 26, 2006
 Sabine Schweizer, "Individuals: The Conceptual Artist", Inside Switzerland, Spring 2007, No. 1
 Vera Huotelin, "When the Sun is a Carpet", Schaffhauser Nachrichten, May 8, 2006 (article online in German)
 "Abstract Painter", Schweizer Touristik, April 7, 2006
 Silvano Cerutti, "World Traveling Painter", 20 Minuten Week, May 26, 2005

References

External links

 Joseph Pisani Official Web Site
 Listing at SIK ISEA - Swiss Institute for Art Research
 Joseph Pisani Official YouTube Channel

American contemporary painters
Abstract painters
Abstract expressionist artists
Living people
21st-century American painters
21st-century American photographers
Photographers from New York City
20th-century American painters
American male painters
1976 births
Painters from New York City
20th-century American male artists
21st-century American male artists